On the Outside Looking In is the second studio album by American hip hop duo Eightball & MJG. The album released on May 24, 1994, by Suave House Records and Relativity Records.

Track listing

Charts

References

1994 albums
8Ball & MJG albums